Chester Deming Long was a member of the Wisconsin State Assembly.

Biography
Long was born on February 15, 1819, in Pembroke, New York. He moved to Darien, Wisconsin Territory in 1839. On November 1, 1843, Long married Laura Ann Lee. They would have five children. He died on June 15, 1884.

Career

Long was elected to the Assembly in 1860. Previously, he was a register of deeds from 1851 to 1852.

References

People from Genesee County, New York
People from Darien, Wisconsin
Members of the Wisconsin State Assembly
1819 births
1884 deaths
19th-century American politicians